Verkhnevilyuysk Airport  is an airport serving the urban locality of Verkhnevilyuysk, Verkhnevilyuysky District, in the Sakha Republic of Russia.

Airlines and destinations

External links

References

  

Airports built in the Soviet Union
Airports in the Sakha Republic